Kevin Cheung (born Cheung Ho Yan; 23 February 1990) is a Mauritian swimmer.

Career
Cheung first competed for Mauritius at the 2005 African Junior Swimming Championships in Beau-Bassin Rose-Hill, Mauritius where competing in the boy's 15 – 16 years age group he finished 4th in the 200 metre breaststroke in 2:42.39, 5th in the 100 metre breaststroke in 1:13.94 and 5th in the 50 metre breaststroke in 34.61.

At the 2007 World Championships in Melbourne, Cheung finished 74th in the 200 metre breaststroke in 2:47.26, 93rd in the 50 metre backstroke in 36.96, 96th in the 50 metre breaststroke in 33.26, 100th in the 100 metre breaststroke in 1:13.87 and 152nd in the 50 metre freestyle in 28.80.

At the 2009 World Championships in Rome, Cheung finished 75th in the 200 metre breaststroke in 2:38.31, 111th in the 50 metre breaststroke in 31.80, 117th in the 100 metre breaststroke in 1:10.25 and with Jean Hugues Gregoire, Ronny Vencatachellum and Jean Marie Froget was disqualified in the 4 × 100 metre medley relay.

References

1990 births
Living people
Mauritian people of Chinese descent
Hakka sportspeople
Mauritian male swimmers
Male backstroke swimmers
Male breaststroke swimmers
Mauritian male freestyle swimmers
Place of birth missing (living people)